Massachusetts elected its members November 2, 1818.  Massachusetts's electoral law required a majority for election, necessitating additional elections in five districts on April 5, 1819, and July 26, 1819.

This was the last election in which the District of Maine was part of Massachusetts. The District became the State of Maine during the 16th Congress.

See also 
 1818 Massachusetts's 20th congressional district special election
 1818 and 1819 United States House of Representatives elections
 List of United States representatives from Massachusetts

Notes

References 

United States House of Representatives elections in Massachusetts
Massachusetts
United States House of Representatives